A railway zig zag or switchback, is a railway operation in which a train is required to switch its direction of travel in order to continue its journey. While this may be required purely from an operations standpoint, it is also ideal for climbing steep gradients with minimal need for tunnels and heavy earthworks. For a short distance (corresponding to the middle leg of the letter "Z"), the direction of travel is reversed, before the original direction is resumed. Some switchbacks do not come in pairs, and the train may then need to travel backwards for a considerable distance.

A location on railways constructed by using a zig-zag alignment at which trains must reverse direction to continue is a reversing station.

One of the best examples is the Darjeeling Himalayan Railway, a UNESCO World Heritage Site railway in India, that has six full zig zags and three spirals.

Advantages 
Zig zags tend to be cheaper to construct because the grades required are discontinuous. Civil engineers can generally find a series of shorter segments going back and forth up the side of a hill more easily and with less grading than they can a continuous grade, which must contend with the larger scale geography of the hills to be surmounted.

Disadvantages 
Zig zags suffer from a number of limitations:
 The length of trains is limited to what will fit on the shortest stub track in the zig zag. For this reason, the Lithgow Zig Zag's stubs were extended at great expense in 1908. Even then, delays were such that the zig zag had eventually to be bypassed by a new route, opened two years later.
 Reversing a locomotive-hauled train not purposely equipped for push-pull operation without first running the engine around to the rear of the train can be hazardous – although operating the train with two locomotives, one at each end (a practice known as "topping-and-tailing"), can mitigate the dangers.
 The need to stop the train after each segment, throw the switch, and then reverse means that progress through the zig zag is slow.
 Passenger cars with transverse seating force riders to travel in reverse for at least part of the journey, though this issue is largely solved by longitudinal seating on cars serving such routes.

Hazards 
If the wagons in a freight train are marshaled poorly, with a light vehicle located between heavier ones (particularly with buffer couplings), the move on the middle road of a zig zag can cause derailment of the light wagon.

Examples 
 Argentina
 Tren a las Nubes (1921)

 Australia
 Lithgow Zig Zag, New South Wales (1869–1910) preserved - see Zig Zag Railway
 Out of use:
 Kalamunda Zig Zag, Western Australia – two reversals (dismantled)
 Lake Margaret Tram, Tasmania,  (dismantled)
 Lapstone Zig Zag, New South Wales – two reversals (1865) (dismantled)
 Mundaring Weir Branch Railway, Western Australia (dismantled)
 Thornleigh Zig Zag, New South Wales (dismantled)
 Yarloop, Western Australia (dismantled)
 Yarraglen (dismantled)

 Chile
 Pisagua – Three reversals; long out of use but earthworks easy to trace

 China
 Mifengyan on the Jiayang Coal Railway  - one reversal
 Qinglongqiao on the Jingbao Railway

Czech Republic
Dubí - local railway between Moldava and Most (Most–Moldava railway), trains have to change direction in station Dubí in order to continue further. Only one halt of a 'Z' is placed

 Denmark
 Lemvig – Small side track from the harbor to the railway station, used only on special occasions. In reality only half a 'Z' as only one reversal is needed.

 Ecuador
 Sibambe on the Quito-Guayaquil line (cf. Empresa de Ferrocarriles Ecuatorianos)

 France
 Froissy Dompierre Light Railway

 Germany
 In use:
 Rauenstein (Hinterland Railway)
 Lauscha (Sonneberg – Probstzella railway)
 Lüttmoorsiel-Nordstrandischmoor island railway
 Michaelstein (Rübeland Railway)
 Rennsteig (Rennsteig Railway, Ilmenau – Themar)
 Wurzbach (Saalfeld – Blankenstein railway)
 out of use
 Lenzkirch in the Black Forest (dismantled)
 Mainspitze station  in Frankfurt am Main, used from 1846–1848 to reach the provisional Frankfurt terminal of the Main-Neckar Railway (dismantled)
 Schillingsfürst (dismantled)
 Elm (replaced in 1914 by Distelrasen Tunnel, but the structure is conserved within the Frankfurt-Fulda and Fulda-Gemünden railways and the connecting curve between the stations at Elm and Schlüchtern
 Steinhelle-Medebach railway (double zig zag)

 Hungary
 The Szob-Nagybörzsöny forest railway has a simple zig zag at the middle of the railway line between Kisirtás and Tolmács-hegy stations, with a loop in the middle of the Z shape

 India
 Darjeeling Himalayan Railway has six full zig zags and 3 spirals, most are from the construction of the current railway but one was added in the 1940s and at least one other was used temporarily following storm damage
 Matheran_Hill_Railway has three zig zags and one "kiss tunnel", said to be only long enough for a single kiss in the darkness.

 Indonesia
 Jalur kereta api Cikampek–Padalarang Dutch East Indies made this line to shorten the travel time between the two biggest cities Jakarta and Bandung it was home to some of the most powerful steam locomotive in Java the SS 1200 made by ALCO or the Indonesian class Lokomotif DD50

 Italy
 Ferrovia Genova-Casella has one zig zag currently in regular use at Casella Deposito (actually a single reversal)
 Cecina-Volterra railway (this section of the line was closed in 1958)
 the Menaggio–Porlezza railway had a single reversal near Menaggio

 Japan
 Hakone Tozan Line has three zig zags, namely at Deyama S.B., Ōhiradai Station, Kami-Ōhidradai S.B.
 Hisatsu Line at Okoba and Masaki stations
 Hōhi Main Line at Tateno Station
 Itsukaichi Line at Musashi-Itsukaichi Station to Musashi-Iwai Station (this section of the line was closed in 1981).
 Kisuki Line at Izumo-Sakane Station
 Keikyu Main Line at Keikyū Kamata Station for trains operating direct service between Yokohama Station and Haneda Airport: This switchback exists purely from an operational standpoint and is not influenced by terrain obstacles.
 Shinonoi Line Obasute Station in Chikuma, Nagano, is on a switchback
 The Tateyama Sabō Erosion Control Works Service Train (not publicly accessible) is notable for operating on a line with 38 zig zags, 18 of them in a row

 Mexico
 Ferrocarril Noroeste de México, between Juan Mata Ortiz to Chico
 Myanmar (also known as Burma)
 Passenger line between Thazi and Kalaw, with four switchbacks; still in use
 Passenger line between Mandalay and Lashio

 New Zealand
 Driving Creek Railway, Coromandel

 North Korea
 Kanggye Line, between Hwangp'o and Simrip'yŏng stations
 Kŭmgangsan Electric Railway, between Tanballyŏng and Malhwiri (Kŭmganggu) stations. Entire line destroyed during the Korean War and not rebuilt
 Paengmu Line, between Yugok and Rajŏk stations, and at Samyu station (station is located on a single reverse)
 in addition, there are numerous switchbacks on spurs into underground facilities located off main lines.

 Pakistan
 Khyber Pass Railway

 Peru
 PeruRail between Cuzco to Machu Picchu – Five switchbacks
 Seven full Zigzags and one single reverse on the Central Railway of Peru

 Slovakia
 Historical Logging Switchback Railway in Vychylovka

 South Africa
 Tierkrans Switchback Railway, between Barkley East station and Aliwal-North station. For economic reasons regular service was finally discontinued in 1991. Railway enthusiasts also know the line for the famous set of eight reverses.

 South Korea
 Yeongdong Line, between Heungjeon station and Nahanjeong station. This section closed in 2012 and replaced by Solan tunnel

 Sweden
 Lövsjöväxeln (Lövsjö points) on Hällefors-Fredriksbergs Järnvägar (1875–1940)
 Visby harbour från Visby station, 32 meters of difference, (1868-1962),

 Switzerland
 Chambrelien station on the Neuchâtel–Le Locle-Col-des-Roches line. Before electrification, a turntable was required to allow large tender locomotives to be turned as they ran around their trains
 Combe-Tabeillon station on the Saignelégier-Glovelier line
 Grindelwald Grund railway station
 trains on each of the three narrow gauge lines out of Aigle have to reverse somewhere en route (Aigle–Leysin, Aigle–Sépey–Diablerets, Aigle–Ollon–Monthey–Champéry)

 Taiwan
 Alishan Forest Railway

 United Kingdom
 Spittal, Northumberland, – The former mineral branch to Tweed Dock required 2 reversals to descend 20m from the East Coast Main Line to near sea level.  

 United States
 Buckingham Branch Railroad, New Canton, Virginia – One switchback at New Canton
 Eight switchbacks at Cascade on GN – Replaced by tunnel which was in turn replaced by a longer tunnel
 Cass Scenic Railroad, West Virginia – Two switchbacks with 11% grade between, still in use
 Colorado and Southern Railway, Central City, Colorado – Two switchbacks on the ascent from Black Hawk, Colorado to Central City
 Confusion Hill Mountain Train Ride, Piercy, California – Several switchbacks in use
 Fern Rock Transportation Center, Fern Rock, Philadelphia - One switchback, connects the Broad Street Line with SEPTA Regional Rail, still in limited use
 Hagans Switchback in Virginia, Still in use by CSX for Coal trains
 Industrial switchback, Montage Mountain Road, Scranton, Pennsylvania – Still in use
 Market Street Railway 33 18th and Park streetcar, San Francisco, California – One switchback, route converted to trolleybus but still largely following original alignment with a very sharp turn at the former switchback
 Mount Hood Railroad, Hood River, Oregon – One switchback, still in use
 Northern Pacific's Coeur d'Alene Branch, Lookout Pass – One switchback east of Mullan, Idaho along its 4% descent towards Wallace
 Roaring Camp and Big Trees Narrow Gauge Railroad, Felton, California – One switchback, still in use
 Shasta Sunset Dinner Train, McCloud, California – One switchback, "Signal Butte Switchback", in use
 Sierra Railway, Melones, California - Two switchbacks, abandoned, used by SRY's Angels Branch to cross Stanislaus River Canyon, one switchback inundated by New Melones Lake

References 

Railway track layouts